Brina Švigelj-Mérat (alias, Brina Svit; born 31 May 1954 in Ljubljana) is a Slovenian writer.

She studied French Philology and Comparative Literature at the University of Ljubljana, and she moved to Paris in 1980

Bibliography
Con brio, 1998 
Smrt slovenske primadone, 2000
Moreno, 2003
Un cœur de trop, 2006
Coco Dias ou la Porte Dorée, 2007.
 Petit éloge de la rupture, 2009 
 Une nuit à Reykjavík, 2011
 Visage slovène, 2013

References

External links
 EVENE

1954 births
Living people
Writers from Ljubljana
European writers in French
University of Ljubljana alumni